The Audition is a demo album by American singer and songwriter Janelle Monáe, self-released and self-financed in 2003. Some versions of the album were later entitled Metropolis: Point Zero.

The album features thirteen songs and one instrumental, "I Won't Let Go". Before signing with Bad Boy Records, she distributed the album independently under the Wondaland Arts Society label, out of the Atlanta boarding house she was living in at the time. There are fewer than 500 physical copies in existence. The album features a cover of the song "Time Will Reveal" by DeBarge, which was later featured along with "Lettin' Go" on the Purple Ribbon All-Stars' 2005 studio album Got Purp? Vol. 2.

Track listing

References

External links 
 

Demo albums
Janelle Monáe albums
Metropolis albums
Self-released albums
2003 albums
Contemporary R&B albums by American artists